Sidney Appelboom (born 24 February 1967) is a retired Belgian breaststroke and medley swimmer. He competed in three events at the 1988 Summer Olympics.

He won a gold medal in the 200 m breaststroke at the 1989 Maccabiah Games in Israel.

References

External links
 

1967 births
Living people
Belgian male breaststroke swimmers
Belgian male medley swimmers
Maccabiah Games medalists in swimming
Maccabiah Games gold medalists
Maccabiah Games competitors by country
Competitors at the 1989 Maccabiah Games
Olympic swimmers of Belgium
Swimmers at the 1988 Summer Olympics
Swimmers from Antwerp